Ricardo Márquez (9 November 1997) is a footballer from Santa Marta, Colombia who plays as a forward for Unión Magdalena.

References 

1997 births
Living people
Association football forwards
Colombian footballers
Categoría Primera A players
Unión Magdalena footballers
People from Santa Marta
Sportspeople from Magdalena Department